Aichinger is a surname. Notable people with the surname include:

Gregor Aichinger (1564–1628), German composer
Ilse Aichinger (1921–2016), Austrian writer
Oskar Aichinger (born 1956), Austrian jazz pianist
Utz Aichinger (born 1938), West German field hockey player

See also
Eichinger
Aich (disambiguation)
Aicher

German-language surnames